Seven Lively Arts or The Seven Lively Arts may refer to:

 The Seven Lively Arts, a 1923 book by Gilbert Seldes
 Seven Lively Arts, a 1944 Broadway revue produced by Billy Rose
 The Seven Lively Arts, a 1957 TV anthology series
 The Seven Lively Arts (Dalí), 1944 and 1957 series of paintings by Salvador Dalí